is a series of fighting games by Arc System Works, created and designed by artist Daisuke Ishiwatari. The first game was published in 1998, and has spawned several sequels. It has also adapted to other media such as manga and drama CD. Guilty Gear has generally received praise from video game reviewers for its highly technical gameplay, graphics, soundtrack, and for its characters. Another fighting game franchise by Arc System Works, BlazBlue, is considered a spiritual successor of the series.

Synopsis 

The story is set in a world where magic has replaced almost every aspect of modern-day technology. But through its dire consequences leading up to the creation of the gears, the world has nearly become a post-apocalyptic environment due to Crusades’ effects on the world. But even though the world is still recovering, much work is still needed to be done and the mysteries behind the creation of the gears have yet to be resolved. 

The story mostly focuses on Sol Badguy, a brash bounty hunter and die hard Queen enthusiast who, feeling guilty of his past creations which in turn, results in him becoming a gear, decides to make up for his own actions through fighting them whilst keeping his own identity a secret. However, his own reluctance to help others, as well as his selfish actions, often attracts the attention of Ky Kiske, his own rival and former comrade, who tries to get into fights with him whenever annoyed. Throughout the story, Sol enacts his own vengeance upon That Man, who is mainly the cause behind most of the series conflicts, through killing him.

As the series progresses, much of his past is revealed, along with his connections with That Man, as well as his long lost fiancé, Aria. With it, Sol begins to realize that his own past is what deeply conflicts him the most, and through his past rivalries with Ky, as well as his relationships with the other characters, helps to overcome the enemy that he sorely sought to destroy in the first place.

Games

Main series

Updated versions

Spin-offs

Gameplay 
Guilty Gear consists primarily of one-on-one competitive battles. Players are tasked with depleting their opponent's life gauge by utilizing attacks unique to each playable character. In the case of timed matches, the player with the most remaining life when time runs out is the victor of that round. The series' emphasis on speed and technicality and introduction of unique movement options such as an "air dash" would ultimately become the foundation for the "anime" subgenre of fighting games.

Guilty Gear Isuka prominently allowed up to four simultaneous players in battle, as well as the option to divide the characters into teams. It also eschewed the typical multiple-round format in favor of each player having a limited stock of "souls". Depleting a player's life gauge decreased their stock of souls and temporarily incapacitated them, and each remaining soul allowed a player to return to battle with a full life gauge. They would be defeated for the rest of the match if their life gauge and souls were both exhausted. These features have not returned for subsequent games.

Each game in the series includes a "Tension Gauge" that fills as the player performs offensive maneuvers, such as approaching the opponent or attacking them. Portions of the Tension Gauge can be expended to perform various techniques. Each character has at least one Overdrive, special attacks that can deal extensive damage to an opponent or bolster aspects of the user, like speed or attack power. "Faultless Defense" allows players to prevent "chip damage," damage received from normally guarding against attacks, at the expense of the Tension Gauge. Guilty Gear X and later titles introduced more advanced techniques involving the Tension Gauge, such as the "Roman Cancel", allowing players to immediately stop the remaining animation of an attack, and "Dead Angle Attacks", counterattacks performed while a player is guarding.

In Guilty Gear, these attacks ended the entire match if they successfully hit the opponent, but this was toned down in later games by ending the round instead. Failing to connect with the technique penalizes the user by removing the Tension Gauge and its related uses for the rest of the round.

Guilty Gear X2 introduced a "Burst Gauge" that slowly fills during the progression of a match. When completely filled, players can perform a "Psyche Burst" in an attempt to quickly stop an opponent's offense, even knocking back the opponent if they are close enough. This mechanic has also appeared in some form in other Arc System Works games, such as BlazBlue and Persona 4 Arena, as well as other fighting games such as Skullgirls.

Many characters also feature their own unique mechanics that differentiate them from each other. For example, Zato-1 utilizes a shadow-like symbiotic creature named Eddie that is able to detach itself and be controlled separately for a period of time, allowing complex tandem attacks between the two. Venom can set out weaponized billiard balls on screen that can be projected in various directions depending on how the player strikes them with certain attacks. Johnny carries a limited set of coins that can be thrown at the opponent. Though the coins themselves deal little damage, each successive hit strengthens his "Mist Finer" technique to incredibly powerful levels.

Playable characters

Notes
 Playable in the Slash update onward, Guilty Gear XX Slash.

 Only playable in the PlayStation 2 version.

 Only in Guilty Gear Petit 2.
 Only in the update version, Guilty Gear X Plus.
 Only playable in the update/sequel version, Guilty Gear Xrd -REVELATOR-.
 Kliff and Justice were balanced for tournament play in the Guilty Gear XX Accent Core Plus R update, and were absent in Guilty Gear XX Accent Core.
 Only playable in the update/sequel version, Guilty Gear Xrd Rev 2.
 Paid DLC only.
 Appear under the name "Bedman?", who is Bedman’s sentient weaponized bed robot accompanied by his sister Delilah.

Media
In addition to the Guilty Gear video game series, other products were also released. A manga titled , a collaboration among Daisuke Ishiwatari, Norimitsu Kaihō, and Akihito Sumii, was serialized in Kodansha's Magazine Z on September 22, 2003. Studio DNA and Enterbrain also published comics anthologies. Several drama CDs were published; Scitron released a series of two drama CDs—Guilty Gear X Vol. 1 and Vol. 2—between October 24, and November 24, 2001, and two series of drama CDs based on Guilty Gear X2  were released by Team Entertainment: Red and Black—a series— were released in 2003 between July 16, and August 20. Another series of drama CDs, Night of Knives, was published in three volumes between October 20 and December 22, 2004. Also action figures, guidebooks, and a trading card game series based on Guilty Gear were released. On February 11, 2017, Arc System Works announced a collaboration with Tecmo Koei's Team Ninja to release Arc System Works Costume Set consisting the costumes of some characters from BlazBlue and Guilty Gear series in March 2017 for Dead or Alive 5: Last Round.

Reception and legacy

 
The Guilty Gear series is considered a cult classic among video game fans. The series has often been remarked upon for its visual elements, fighting engine, soundtrack, and the variety of designs of the characters and attacks. Xs Dreamcast version has the highest score of the series as compiled by review aggregator GameRankings (89.33%), while X2 for PlayStation 2 occupies that position according to the other major aggregator, Metacritic (87). On the other hand, the lowest score is given to Guilty Gear 2: Overture from both GameRankings (58.19%) and Metacritic (56/100).

Guilty Gear is considered by several sources to be the greatest 2D fighting game. GameSpot said that "Guilty Gear is one of the few non-Capcom or SNK 2D fighters to make any sort of impact on the genre", while Eurogamer stated: "If 2D beat-em-ups are moving toward extinction, they really are ending on a high note with stuff like this." Its sequels were also well received. GameSpy said "Guilty Gear X is hands-down the best 2D fighting game to date", and Guilty Gear X2 was described by About.com as "easily the best 2D fighter to come around in a long time."

In 2012, Complex ranked Guilty Gear at number 47 on the list of the best video game franchises, commenting: "Where other fighters were moving toward realism and more down to Earth physics and combos, Guilty Gear was content to turn those notions on their head, paving the way for the more chaotic fighters we're seeing today." Yahoo! Voices' editor S.W. Hampson included Guilty Gear among the 10 best fighting game franchises of all time, praising the series's evolution along the years, the "distinctive visual flair" of its 2D sprites, and the "well-defined story lines", adding "its identity is among the most unique in the world of beat-'em-ups."

BlazBlue: Calamity Trigger, another fighting game developed by Arc System Works, is often referred to as a spiritual successor of the Guilty Gear series.

References

External links

Official homepage of the Guilty Gear series 

 
2D fighting games
Arc System Works franchises
Fighting video games by series
Dystopian video games
Video game franchises introduced in 1998